The Barnes–Hut simulation (named after Josh Barnes and Piet Hut) is an approximation algorithm for performing an n-body simulation. It is notable for having order O(n log n) compared to a direct-sum algorithm which would be O(n2).

The simulation volume is usually divided up into cubic cells via an octree (in a three-dimensional space), so that only particles from nearby cells need to be treated individually, and particles in distant cells can be treated as a single large particle centered at the cell's center of mass (or as a low-order multipole expansion). This can dramatically reduce the number of particle pair interactions that must be computed.

Some of the most demanding high-performance computing projects do computational astrophysics using the Barnes–Hut treecode algorithm,
such as DEGIMA.

Algorithm

The Barnes–Hut tree 
In a three-dimensional n-body simulation, the Barnes–Hut algorithm recursively divides the n bodies into groups by storing them in an octree (or a quad-tree in a 2D simulation). Each node in this tree represents a region of the three-dimensional space. 
The topmost node represents the whole space, and its eight children represent the eight octants of the space. The space is recursively subdivided into octants until each subdivision contains 0 or 1 bodies (some regions do not have bodies in all of their octants). 
There are two types of nodes in the octree: internal and external nodes. An external node has no children and is either empty or represents a single body. Each internal node represents the group of bodies beneath it, and stores the center of mass and the total mass of all its children bodies.

Calculating the force acting on a body 
To calculate the net force on a particular body, the nodes of the tree are traversed, starting from the root. If the center of mass of an internal node is sufficiently far from the body, the bodies contained in that part of the tree are treated as a single particle whose position and mass is respectively the center of mass and total mass of the internal node. If the internal node is sufficiently close to the body, the process is repeated for each of its children.

Whether a node is or isn't sufficiently far away from a body, depends on the quotient , where s is the width of the region represented by the internal node, and d is the distance between the body and the node's center of mass. The node is sufficiently far away when this ratio is smaller than a threshold value θ. The parameter θ determines the accuracy of the simulation; larger values of θ increase the speed of the simulation but decreases its accuracy. If θ = 0, no internal node is treated as a single body and the algorithm degenerates to a direct-sum algorithm.

See also 

 NEMO (Stellar Dynamics Toolbox)
 Nearest neighbor search
 Fast multipole method

References and sources
References

Sources

External links
Treecodes, J. Barnes
Parallel TreeCode
HTML5/JavaScript Example Graphical Barnes–Hut Simulation
PEPC – The Pretty Efficient Parallel Coulomb solver, an open-source parallel Barnes–Hut tree code with exchangeable interaction kernel for a multitude of applications
Parallel GPU N-body simulation program with fast stackless particles tree traversal
Barnes-Hut galaxy simulator at beltoforion.de

Simulation
Gravity
Physical cosmology
Numerical integration (quadrature)
Articles containing video clips